McNab/Braeside is a township in eastern Ontario, Canada, on the south shore of Chats Lake (part of the Ottawa River), straddling the lower Madawaska River in Renfrew County.

The township was created on January 1, 1998, when the Village of Braeside amalgamated with McNab Township.

History
McNab township was created in 1825, comprising roughly 80,000 acres of unsettled land, covering the current Town of Arnprior and Township of McNab/Braeside. It was granted by the government ("Family Compact") to Archibald 13th Laird of McNab (1779-1860), who had fled from his debts in Scotland. He promised to settle it with Highland clansmen, and the first group of eighty-four settlers arrived the same year, 1825. McNab ruled with an iron fist over the Scottish settlers. Only after eighteen years of petitions, court battles, and appeals was his grip loosened when the government finally began issuing Crown grants to the settlers. His feudal powers removed, the Laird eventually sold his lands to the government and returned to Europe in 1852, never to return.

Braeside was named in 1872 by W.J. McDonald probably for Braeside, Greenock in Inverclyde, Scotland.

Communities
In addition to the main town of Braeside, the township also comprises the communities of Burnstown, Clay Bank, Clay Valley, Dewars, Glasgow Station, Goshen, Lochwinnoch (partially), Lundys Corners, Pine Grove, Sand Point, Stewartville, Rhoddy’s Bay, Waba and White Lake.

Mayors
 Tom Peckett (2014– )
 Mary M. Campbell (2006–2014)

Demographics 

Notable people
 D'Alton Corry Coleman (1879–1956), president of the Canadian Pacific Railway

See also
List of townships in Ontario

References

External links 

Lower-tier municipalities in Ontario
Municipalities in Renfrew County
Township municipalities in Ontario